"Throw the 'R' Away" is a song by Scottish music duo the Proclaimers from the 1987 album This Is the Story. The band's first single, "Throw the 'R' Away" was released in 1987.

Content

Musical style 
Describing the single, Chicago Reader'''s Bill Wyman commented "it's a rollicking folk number, complete with wordless shouts and a rousing finale".

 Lyrical theme 
In 1989, Mike Bohem of the Los Angeles Times'' called "Throw the 'R' Away" a "celebration of the thick accent that some experts had said would hold them back".

References

1987 singles
1987 songs
The Proclaimers songs